Day-Glo (Based on a True Story) is the nineteenth studio album by Erasure, released on 12 August 2022. The album was created by reconstructing tracks from the group's previous album The Neon (2020) and is experimental in nature.

Background

The Neon was recorded during the COVID-19 lockdowns and released in August 2020, placing at number four on the UK Albums Chart on its release, the band's highest placement on the chart since 1994's I Say I Say I Say. Day-Glo (Based on a True Story) was created by Vince Clarke rearranging and remixing recordings of The Neon sessions and sending the instrumental tracks to Andy Bell to add vocals. The album was made in collaboration with producer Gareth Jones.

Critical reception

Retro Pop rated it four stars out of five and wrote "almost four decades into their career they've thrown a curveball and put out an album filled with self-referential gems and, although perhaps not to everyone's taste, it stands out as one of the most intriguing, creative projects in their catalogue."

The Quietus gave it a favourable review and said "The whole album is an admirable exercise in sonic restraint."

Riff Magazine wrote, "Far from queer disco anthems, they're moody '90s B-side remixes, murky Brian Eno tracks or downtempo Saint Etienne non-singles. It's not a turn-off, but it's definitely a vibe. And that vibe is more along the lines of, Shit, what just happened to the world?"

i and The Scotsman both awarded the album three stars out of five.

Track listing

Charts

References

2022 albums
Erasure albums